Volny (Ŝḥafit) is a rural locality (a khutor) in Krasnoulskoye Rural Settlement of Maykopsky District, Russia. The population was 268 as of 2018. There are 3 streets.

Geography 
Volny is located 30 km north of Tulsky (the district's administrative centre) by road. Krasnaya Ulka is the nearest rural locality.

References 

Rural localities in Maykopsky District